The term "encounter", in the context of existential-humanism (like existential therapy), has the specific meaning of an authentic, congruent meeting between individuals.

Examples
Some uses of the concept of encountering:

 Jacob L. Moreno Invitations to an Encounter, 1914
 Martin Buber frequently uses this term and associated ideas.
 Irvin Yalom in his book "Existential Psychotherapy".
 Carl Rogers, in encounter groups and person-centered psychotherapy.
 Jerzy Grotowski's notion of a "poor theatre" – "The core of the theatre is an encounter".
 R D Laing contrasts encounter with collusion in much of his work, especially Self and Others.

Existentialist concepts
Existential therapy